Middle Lake is a village in the Canadian province of Saskatchewan within the Rural Municipality of Three Lakes No. 400 and Census Division No. 15.

Middle Lake has a public K-12 school, a nursing home, and a regional park. The surrounding area is largely agricultural.

The village has multiple volunteer organizations including Three Lakes First Responders, Three Lakes Fire Department, and Lions.

Community amenities include a gym, bowling alley, regional park, community hall, senior's centre, skating rink, 4-H, and a music studio.

There are a number of businesses in the area, including Middle Lake Steel, Middle Lake Hotel & Bar, Terry's Lucky Dollar, Kirsch Construction, Middle Lake Massage, Zimmer's Service, Sears, Three Lakes Automotive, Conexus Credit Union, Family Fun RV & Auto, and multiple home businesses such as Partylite, Avon, Epicure, Mary Kay, 5th Avenue Collection, Jockey for Her.

History 
Middle Lake incorporated as a village on January 1, 1963.

Demographics 

See also 

 List of communities in Saskatchewan
 Villages of Saskatchewan

References

External links
Middle Lake Village Council
Village of Middle Lake
Saskatchewan City & Town Maps
Saskatchewan Gen Web - One Room School Project 
Post Offices and Postmasters - ArchiviaNet - Library and Archives Canada
Saskatchewan Gen Web Region
Online Historical Map Digitization Project
GeoNames Query 
2006 Community Profiles

Villages in Saskatchewan
Three Lakes No. 400, Saskatchewan
Division No. 15, Saskatchewan